Luke Walker may refer to:

Luke Walker (born 1943), former pitcher in Major League Baseball 
Luke Walker (filmmaker), British film maker 
Luke Walker (ice hockey) (born 1990), American ice hockey forward 
Luke Walker, musician with The Summer Obsession